Severino Gazzelloni, born Severino Gazzellone (5 January 1919 – 21 November 1992) was an Italian flutist.

Biography 

He was born in Roccasecca and died in Cassino. Gazzelloni was the principal flautist with the RAI National Symphony Orchestra in Turin for 30 years and dedicatee of many works. Composers including Luciano Berio (Sequenza I for solo flute, 1958), Pierre Boulez, Bruno Maderna and Igor Stravinsky wrote pieces for him.

Gazzelloni was also a flute teacher. Some of his notable pupils include jazz player Eric Dolphy, classical flautist Abbie de Quant, flautists Ann Cherry and Carol Wincenc, composer Norma Beecroft, and audio engineer Marina Bosi. Dolphy honored Gazzelloni by naming a composition for him which he included in his 1964 Out to Lunch! album.

In summer 1976 he toured through Italy, performing with classical pianist Bruno Canino and a jazz combo that included  Enrico Intra (piano), Giancarlo Barigozzi  (tenor saxophone), Pino Presti (electric bass), Tullio De Piscopo (drums), and Sergio Farina 
(electric guitar).

Filmography 
 1980: "FF.SS." – Cioè: "...che mi hai portato a fare sopra a Posillipo se non mi vuoi più bene?"

References

Bibliography 
 Alessandra Vaccarone, Riflessi d'un flauto d'oro. Severino Gazzelloni e la letteratura flautistica contemporanea (1952-1980), Rome, Riverberi Sonori, 2002.

Italian flautists
1919 births
1992 deaths
20th-century Italian musicians
Italian jazz musicians
Italian classical musicians
20th-century flautists